California Credit Union (CCU), previously known as the Los Angeles Teachers Credit Union, is a state-chartered credit union in Southern California that focuses on providing financial services to residents of three Southern California counties as well as teachers and others in the education community.

 it was the 14th largest credit union by asset size in California with $3 billion in assets and 24 branches.

History 
Los Angeles Teachers Credit Union was founded in 1933 to provide financial services to teachers and others in the education community. 

In 1995 the credit union changed its name to California Credit Union.

A branch of the credit union was held up by three armed robbers in 1996.

In 2011, the credit union reacquired the building at 701 N. Brand in Los Angeles as its headquarters from MPG Office Trust. The credit union had originally sold the building in 2006.

Effective March 1, 2017, it merged with North Island Credit Union of San Diego.

Membership 
CCU has more than 165,000 members. Membership is available to individuals and businesses in Orange, Riverside and San Diego counties as well as to residents of California who meet one of the following requirements:
     Los Angeles Unified School District employee  
     Los Angeles County Office of Education employee
     Retired educator 
     Charter school employee 
     College / university employee 
     Private school employee 
     Alumni association member 
     Parent Teacher Association member

Regulation 
California Credit Union is regulated under the authority of both the California Department of Financial Institutions and the National Credit Union Administration (NCUA), an agency of the U.S. federal government.  Deposits are federally insured by the NCUA.

References 

Credit unions based in California
1933 establishments in California
Banks established in 1933
Companies based in Glendale, California